Mira B, also known as VZ Ceti, is the companion star to the variable star Mira, separated by around . Suspected as early as 1918, it was visually confirmed in 1923 by Robert Grant Aitken, and has been observed more or less continually since then, most recently by the Chandra X-Ray Observatory.

Long known to be erratically variable itself, its fluctuations seem to be related to its accretion of matter from Mira's stellar wind, which makes it a symbiotic star.

Orbit
Its orbit around Mira is poorly known; the most recent estimate listed in the Sixth Catalog of Orbits of Visual Binary Stars gives an orbital period of roughly 500 years, with a periastron around the year 2285. Assuming the distance in the Hipparcos catalog and orbit are correct, Mira A and B are separated by an average of 100 AU.

Current research

In January 2007, astronomers at the Keck Observatory announced the discovery of a protoplanetary disk around Mira B. Discovered via infrared data, the disk is apparently derived from captured material from Mira itself; Mira B accretes as much as one percent of the matter lost by its primary. Though planetary formation is perhaps unlikely as long as the disk is in active accretion, it may proceed apace once Mira A completes its red giant phase and becomes a white dwarf remnant.

Several factors, such as low x-ray luminosity, suggest that Mira B is actually a normal main-sequence star of spectral type K and roughly 0.7 solar mass, rather than a white dwarf as first envisioned. However, a 2010 analysis of rapid optical brightness variations has indicated that Mira B is, in fact, a white dwarf.

External links
From the AAVSO Variable Star of the Month: Mira 
Sixth Orbit Catalog
Chandra Photo Album, Mira press release
 Born Again Protoplanetary Disk Around Mira B

References

Binary stars
White dwarfs
Cetus (constellation)
Ceti, Omicron, B
Ceti, VZ
Astronomical objects discovered in 1923